Etchinghill, also known as Etching Hill, was once a singular village, until it was engulfed by the simultaneous growth of Rugeley, Staffordshire.  It is now an electoral district/ward.  Etching Hill is situated just over one mile from the actual town centre. Its name historically derives from the large, forested hill on Mount Road - famed for its characteristic ice-age sandstone tip. Etching Hill backs on to Cannock Chase and comprises several housing estates; a recognisable mixture of buildings from the town's early years and numerous modern developments. The area is much-coveted by those looking to move to Rugeley because of its scenic qualities and the presence of two successful primary schools.

Etching Hill is a very short distance away from the forest location that has hosted open-air concerts for music acts such as Status Quo, The Zutons, Jools Holland, and UB40. The event, scheduled by the Forestry Commission, was subject to much controversy; certain local residents of neighbouring Slitting Mill harboured fears that the successive performances would be detrimental to the local wildlife and disruptive to the local population. This was proved to be unfounded. The venue continues to attract big names on a yearly basis.

Etching Hill is also the home of Rugeley Cricket and Tennis Clubs, and was the location of a horse racing course in the 1800s.

External links
 Brereton and Rugeley Parish Website
 Etching Hill Women's Institute Website

Villages in Staffordshire
Rugeley